Federal Route 73, or Jalan Seputeh–Batu Hampar, is a federal road in Perak, Malaysia. The roads connects Batu Hampar in the west to Seputeh in the east.

Route background
The Kilometre Zero of the Federal Route 73 starts at Seputeh.

Features
At most sections, the Federal Route 73 was built under the JKR R5 road standard, with a speed limit of 90 km/h.

List of junctions and towns

References

Malaysian Federal Roads